is a railway station on the Tsugaru Line in the town of Sotogahama, Aomori, Japan, operated by East Japan Railway Company (JR East).

Lines
Naka-Oguni Station is served by the JR East Tsugaru Line and is 31.4 km from the southern terminus of the line at Aomori Station.

Station layout
Naka-Oguni Station has one side platform serving a single bidirectional track. The station is unattended.

History
The station opened on October 21, 1958, as a station on the Japanese National Railways (JNR). With the privatization of JNR on April 1, 1987, it came under the operational control of JR East. With the opening of the Tsugaru Kaikyō Line on March 13, 1988, operation of the station was shared between JR East and JR Hokkaido, and the station was regarded as the southern starting point of the Tsugaru Kaikyō Line for the determination of railway fares, although no trains of Kaikyō Line stopped at the station, and the effective southern terminus for all Tsugaru Kaikyō Line trains was at Aomori Station. Services on the Tsugaru Kaikyō  ceased on March 26, 2016 when the Hokkaido Shinkansen opened and replaced regular passenger services connecting Aomori and Hakodate.

Surrounding area

 is located 2.3 km north of Naka-Oguni, between Naka-Oguni and Ōdai / Tsugaru-Imabetsu. Up until this point, the Tsugaru Line and Kaikyō Line shared the same tracks from Aomori Station. The junction also marks the border between the electrified portion of the Tsugaru Line (Aomori to Naka-Oguni) and the non-electrified portion (Naka-Oguni to Minmaya), as well as the border between JR East and JR Hokkaido. Also, The Hokkaido Shinkansen tracks from Shin-Aomori Station merge with the Kaikyō Line tracks immediately north of the Junction.

See also
 List of Railway Stations in Japan

External links

 

Stations of East Japan Railway Company
Railway stations in Aomori Prefecture
Tsugaru Line
Tsugaru-Kaikyō Line
Sotogahama, Aomori
Railway stations in Japan opened in 1958